"Save Your Love" is a power ballad by American glam metal band Great White.  It was the second single from their 1987 album Once Bitten. The model Tracy Martinson appeared in the video for "Save Your Love". Also appearing in the video was then-new bassist Tony Montana, who replaced Lorne Black.

Track listing

7": Capitol Records (US)

12": Capitol Records / New Rock Radio Remix (US) 
Promotional only album on white vinyl.

7": Capitol Records (Germany)

12": Capitol Records (Germany)

Personnel 
 Jack Russell – lead vocals
 Mark Kendall – guitar, backing vocals
 Michael Lardie – guitar, harmonica, backing vocals
 Audie Desbrow – drums
Lorne Black – bass, backing vocals (on album)
Tony Montana – bass, backing vocals (on music video)

Charts 
Save Your Love was on the Billboard Hot 100 chart for 12 weeks, peaking at number 57 on February 27, 1988.

References 

1987 songs
1987 singles
Great White songs
Capitol Records singles
Glam metal ballads